Pfau is a German surname meaning "peacock".

Pfau may refer to:

People 
 Sister Edith Pfau (1915–2001), American painter, sculptor and art educator
 Ludwig Pfau (1821–1894), German poet, journalist, and revolutionary
 Ruth Pfau (1929–2017), German nun and medical doctor dedicated to fighting leprosy in Pakistan
 Werner Pfau, German astronomer, former director of the Jena University Observatory, and namesake of asteroid 9962 Pfau
 Horst-Rüdiger Schlöske (born 1946), German sprinter born Horst-Rüdiger Pfau

Other uses 
 9962 Pfau, an asteroid

See also 
 Poe (surname), an Anglicized form of Pfau adopted by some German-Americans